Limbourg (German and Dutch: Limburg) or Limbourg-sur-Vesdre is a city and municipality of Wallonia located in the province of Liège, Belgium.

On 1 January 2008, Limbourg had a total population of 5,680. The total area is 24.63 km² which gives a population density of 231 inhabitants per km². 

The municipality consists of the following districts: Bilstain, Goé, and Limbourg.

The lower part of the town, along the Vesdre, is called Dolhain.

Etymology and history 

The second part of the name Limbourg is from burg meaning a fortified town, which is common in many parts of Europe where Germanic languages are spoken or have been spoken historically (see Germanic placename etymology). Concerning the first part of the name, there are various theories. One is lint meaning "dragon". Another is that it refers back to the Roman-era limes, situated at boundaries of the Empire. It may also have been related to the material lim or lime. Jean-Louis Kupper has proposed that the fort was named by its founder Frederick after Limburg Abbey in Germany, which in his lifetime had important connection to his imperial patrons and the Abbey of Stavelot, for which he was advowee.

Limbourg is located on top of a hill which in its turn is surrounded by the river Vesdre. This was a strong military advantage in the Middle Ages and allowed the city to defend itself against foreign invaders. In the Middle Ages, the ruling family came to have the rank of duke and so the town was the seat of the Duchy of Limburg, which was a part of the Lower Lorraine region of the Holy Roman Empire.

The town featured in the War of the Spanish Succession, falling in 1703 to British and Dutch Republican forces led by the Duke of Marlborough. 

The song 'The Fat Lady of Limbourg' on Brian Eno's 1974 album 'Taking Tiger Mountain (By Strategy)' describes an asylum in the town which has more patients than there are residents of the town.

See also
 List of protected heritage sites in Limbourg
 Duchy of Limburg

References

External links

Historical view of Limbourg

 
Cities in Wallonia
Municipalities of Liège Province